The 1925 Fordham Rams football team was an American football team that represented Fordham University as an independent during the 1925 college football season. In its sixth season under head coach Frank Gargan, Fordham compiled an 8–1 record. James Manning was the team captain.

Schedule

References

Fordham
Fordham Rams football seasons
Fordham Rams football